KAZY (93.7 FM, 93.7 KAZY) is an active rock formatted broadcast radio station licensed to Cheyenne, Wyoming, serving Southeastern Wyoming.  KAZY is owned and operated by Freisland Broadcasting Corporation.

History
The station was assigned the call letters KSHF on August 24, 2005.  On March 6, 2006, the station changed its callsign to KZDR, on March 5, 2008, to KMJY and September 23, 2008, to the current KAZY.

References

External links

AZY
Active rock radio stations in the United States
Radio stations established in 2006